Schulzentrum Saterland (SZS) is a general education day school in Lower Ramsloh, Saterland, in Lower Saxony, Germany, established in 1971, comprising both a primary and a secondary school.  The school's name in their native Sater Frisian is "Grote Skoul fon't Seelterlound," the "Great School of Saterland."
The school consists of both a high school and junior high school. The Laurentius-Siemer-Gymnasium was (as of 2007) being constructed on the same site.

The school is the successor of earlier schools on the site, dating back to 1613,

External links 
 Official website, in German

Schools in Lower Saxony
Educational institutions established in 1971
1613 establishments in the Holy Roman Empire